José Luis Ramos (1790 – May 7, 1849) was a Venezuelan writer and political figure. Ramos served various government roles such as Minister of Foreign Affairs of Venezuela multiple times. He was the Minister of Finance in 1835. He edited the literary magazine La Guirnalda between 1839 and 1850. He is considered the founder of literary journalism in Venezuela. Born in Caracas, he died in Maiguetia.

He was editor of La Guirnalda as of 1839 out of Caracas, which was the first literary magazine in the country, publishing poets such as Rafael María Baralt.

See also
List of Ministers of Foreign Affairs of Venezuela

References

External links
 

 

Venezuelan writers
Venezuelan Ministers of Foreign Affairs
Finance ministers of Venezuela
1790 births
1849 deaths